Rose Royale (1954 – 1957) was a French Thoroughbred racehorse. After showing modest form as a juvenile in France she emerged as a top-class performer in the first half of 1957 when she was an unlucky second in the Princess Elizabeth Stakes before winning the 1000 Guineas and finishing third in the Epsom Oaks. In the autumn she added victories in the Prix du Moulin and the Champion Stakes but died at the end of the year.

Background
Rose Royale was a bay filly bred in France by her owner Aga Khan III. During her racing career she was trained by Alec Head at Chantilly.

She was sired by Prince Bio, who won the Poule d'Essai des Poulains in 1944 and became a very successful breeding stallion whose other offspring included Sicambre. Rose Royale was the first foal of her dam Rose of Yeroda who won twice as a juvenile in 1950. She was descended from Honora (foaled 1907), a British mare whose other descendants have included Tap On Wood, Jaazeiro and Skip Away.

Racing career

1956: two-year-old season
Rose Royale ran six times as a two-year-old in France in 1956 but failed to win a race.

1957: three-year-old season
On her three-year-old debut Rose Royale was sent to England to contest the Princess Elizabeth Stakes over eight and a half furlongs at Epsom Racecourse and looked a most unlucky loser as she finished second to the Queen's filly Carrozza. On 3 May at Newmarket Racecourse the filly started at odds of 6/1 in a 20-runner field for the 144th running of the 1000 Guineas. Ridden by Charlie Smirke, who had been criticised for his performance at Epsom, she won by two lengths from her stablemate Sensualita with the Irish-trained favourite Angelet in third.

The French jockey Jean Massard took over from Smirke when Rose Royale was stepped up in distance and started 11/10 favourite for the Oaks Stakes at Epsom on 7 June. She appeared ill at ease on the firm ground and finished a well-beaten third behind Carrozza and Silken Glider. The filly took a long time to recover from the race and was off the course until September when she finished sixth behind Denisy in the Prix de la Nonette. In the inaugural running of the Prix du Moulin in the following month she was ridden by Roger Poincelet and won from her four-year-old stablemate Chief. Later in October she was back at Newmarket for the ten furlong Champion Stakes and started at odds of 5/2 against opponents including Ballymoss and the Coronation Cup winner Fric. With Massard in the saddle, she came home six lengths clear of the Irish outsider No Complaint, with Fric third and Ballymoss unplaced.

Rose Royale was sent to the United States to contest the Washington D C International but ran poorly and finished unplaced behind Mahan. The filly became sick soon after the race and died from an intestinal tumour.

Assessment and honours
The independent Timeform organisation gave Rose Royale a rating 129 in 1957.

In their book, A Century of Champions, based on the Timeform rating system, John Randall and Tony Morris rated Rose Royale a "superior" winner of the 1000 Guineas.

Pedigree

References

1954 racehorse births
1957 racehorse deaths
Racehorses bred in France
Racehorses trained in France
Thoroughbred family 14-f
1000 Guineas winners